Burak Kut (born 27 August 1973) is a Turkish pop singer and songwriter.

Biography
As a child, Burak attended Müziğe Çapa and played in the orchestra for many years. He continued playing in an orchestra until he entered high school at İstanbul Anadolu Güzel Sanatlar Lisesi, where he began to play flute and piano. Burak then attended Kabataş Erkek Lisesi,  he won the competition three years running.

He released his first album Benimle Oynama/Çılgınım with Peker Music. His rise to fame rocketed, performing over 300 concerts soon after the album was released. He also won the European MTV "Local Hero Award" around this time. Burak did most of the work on his second album Nereden Geldim, Nerelere Gideceğim. His song Yaşandı Bitti gained airplay in New York City, and his popularity now stretched out to the United States.

While working on an album, Burak did a duet with Sarah Brightman accompanied by an orchestra ensemble of 100 musicians. He also sang duets with Greek singer Sakis Rouvas in Cyprus at the Border Line (Yeşil Hat) to help the two nations come together. He self-produced his third album Küçük Prens. He also later signed on to Universal Records and they helped him release a fourth self-titled album in 2000. After seven years, he released "Komple", a cover of Daddy Yankee's Rompe with lyrics written by Sezen Aksu. Burak Kut is releasing his new album called "İlaç" on 11 December 2009, album with 12 songs.

Burak Kut released his first Turkish EP, Sevginin Her Hali in 2013. The record just contains 3 songs all been written by Burak self.

In 2015 Burak, released his first 1 track only song – written by himself  – "Olduğu Kadar Olmadı Kadar".
He also announced in a press presentation in October 2015, he's releasing a featuring album with Greece singer Katy Garbi, expected to release somewhere in December 2015.

Discography

Albums 

 1994 – Benimle Oynama – Çılgınım (Peker Müzik)
 1995 – Nereden Geldim Nerelere Gideceğim (Peker Müzik)
 1997 – Küçük Prens (BBK/Mert Müzik Yapım)
 2000 – Burak Kut (Universal/Avrupa Müzik)
 2007 – Komple (Doğan Music Company)
 2009 – İlaç (Doğan Music Company)

Singles / maxi singles 
 1997 – Derdim Var (Ascot) feat. David Morales 
 2013 – Sevginin Her Hali (Pasaj Müzik)
 2015 – Olduğu Kadar Olmadı Kader (Avrupa Müzik)
 2015 – Kalbine Sor (İYİ MÜZİK/Katy Garbi Productions/Panic Records)  (with Katy Garbi)
 2018 – Hoppa
 2022 – Kafam Leyla

Filmography

Programs 
2007 – Dilimin Ucunda – Presenter – ATV
2009 – Hadi Bakalım – Presenter – TRT Müzik
2011 – Avrasya Yıldızı – Judge – TRT Avaz
2011–2012 – Biz de Varız – Presenter – TRT Avaz
2015 – En Sevdiğim 3 Şarkı – Judge – ATV
2016 – O Ses Çocuklar – Judge – TV8

Theater 
 2010 – Hisseli Harikalar Kumpanyası Broadway
 2016 – Küçük Prens (directed by Alev Baymur)

TV series 
 1993 – Üçüzler (Kemal's son)
 1994 – Kurtuluş (episode 4 extra)
 2007 – Aşk Kapıyı Çalınca (Emre Zeybek)
 2009 – Altın Kızlar (Guest appearance)
 2011 – Nuri (Umut)
 2014 – Güldür Güldür (Himself)
 2014 – Ankara'nın Dikmen'i (Latif)
 2014 – Arkadaşım Hoşgeldin (Himself)
 2015 – [[Günebakan] (movied)|Günebakan]] (Himself)
 2015 – Buyur Burdan Bak (Himself)
 2015 – Adı Mutluluk (Himself)
 2018–2020 Tozkoparan (Cihan)

Cinema 
 2002 – O Şimdi Asker

See also
List of Turkish pop music performers
Turkish pop music

References

1973 births
Living people
Singers from Istanbul
Turkish pop musicians
Turkish pop singers
Turkish singer-songwriters
21st-century Turkish singers
21st-century Turkish male singers